Thorianite is a rare thorium oxide mineral, ThO2. It was originally described by Ananda Coomaraswamy in 1904 as uraninite, but recognized as a new species by Wyndham R. Dunstan. It was so named by Dunstan on account of its high percentage of thorium; it also contains the oxides of uranium, lanthanum, cerium, praseodymium and neodymium. Helium is present, and the mineral is slightly less radioactive than pitchblende, but is harder to shield due to its high energy gamma rays. It is common in the alluvial gem-gravels of Sri Lanka, where it occurs mostly as water worn, small, heavy, black, cubic crystals. The largest crystals are usually near 1.5 cm.

Chemistry
Based on color, specific gravity and composition three types of thorianite are distinguished:
α-thorianite
β-thorianite
γ-thorianite
Thorianite and uraninite form a complete solid solution series in synthetic and natural material. The division between the two species is at Th:U = 1:1 with U possibly making up to 46.50% and Th ranging up to 87.88%. Rare earths, chiefly Ce, substitute for Th in amounts up to 8% by weight. Ce is probably present as Ce4+. Complete series is known in synthetic material between CeO2 - PrO2 - ThO2 - UO2. Small amounts of Fe3+ and Zr also may be isomorphous with Th. Pb present is probably radiogenic.

Varieties
Aldanite – a variety of thorianite containing 14.9% to 29.0% UO2 and 11.2% to 12.5% PbO.
Uranothorianite
Thorianite Cerian
Thorianite La bearing

Occurrence
Usually found in alluvial deposits, beach sands, heavy mineral placers, and pegmatites.

Sri Lanka – In stream gravels, Galle district, Southern Province; Balangoda district; near Kodrugala, Sabaragamuwa Province; and from a pegmatite in Bambarabotuwa area.
India – Reported from beach sands of Travancore (Kerala). 
Madagascar – Found in alluvial deposits of  Betroka and Andolobe. Also as very large crystals from Tôlanaro (Fort Dauphin); at Andranondambo and other localities.
Russia – In black sands of a gold placer on Boshogoch River, Transbaikalia, Siberia; in the Kovdor Massif by Kovdor, Kola Peninsula; in the Yenisei Range, Siberia.
United States – reported from Easton, Pennsylvania; black sands in Missouri River, near Helena, Montana; Scott River, Siskiyou County, California; black sands in Nixon Fork and Wiseman districts, Alaska.
Canada – Reported with uraninite in a pegmatite on Charlebois Lake, east of Lake Athabasca; Uranon variety reported from pegmatite and metesomatized zones in crystalline limestones from many locations in Quebec and Ontario.
South Africa – Occurs with baddeleyite as an accessory in carbonatite at Phalaborwa, Eastern Transvaal.
Democratic Republic of Congo - Kasaï region

See also

 Uraninite
 Thorite
 Classification of minerals
 List of minerals

References

External links

 Uraniumminerals.com
 Mindat.org

Thorium minerals
Oxide minerals
Uranium minerals
Lanthanide minerals
Radioactive minerals
Cubic minerals
Minerals in space group 225